Lourdes-de-Blanc-Sablon is an unconstituted locality within the municipality of Blanc-Sablon in the Côte-Nord region of Quebec, Canada.

Jacques Cartier landed at the place in 1534 and set up a cross near the current site of Lourdes-de-Blanc-Sablon.  The name was known before the Jacques Cartier's explorations. In his accounts of the 1534 voyage, he cites three times Blanc-Sablon, without any explanation. Sablon is an old French term meaning Fine Sand. 
In 1858, the Mission of Longue-Pointe-de-Blanc-Sablon was established and took the name Lourdes-de-Blanc-Sablon or Notre-Dame-de-Lourdes at the end of 19th century.

Lourdes-de-Blanc-Sablon is the largest of three communities forming the municipality of Blanc-Sablon (Blanc-Sablon, Lourdes-de-Blanc-Sablon, and Brador Bay), and is located on the headland that separates Brador Bay from Blanc-Sablon Bay. It was originally known as Longue-Pointe (Long Point) until the beginning of the 20th century. It has a small natural harbour, and long depended on the fishing business. Its population in the 2011 census was 828.

Demographics 

Education
Commission scolaire du Littoral operates the Anglophone and Francophone school Mgr-Scheffer School  in Lourdes-de-Blanc-Sablon.

Climate

Lourdes-de-Blanc-Sablon has a subarctic climate (Köppen Dfc) that is influenced by the surrounding sea, moderating summer temperatures, and also ensuring winters are less severe than inland, although this region of Quebec is severely cold annually by global standards for the latitude.

References

Communities in Côte-Nord
Designated places in Quebec
Unconstituted localities in Quebec